Flamingokvintetten is a Swedish dansband formed in Partille in 1960. The group consists of Hasse Carlsson (lead vocals and rhythm guitar), Dennis Janebrink (bass guitar), Stefan Kardebratt (keyboards), Douglas Möller (lead guitar) and Ulf Georgsson (drums).

Personnel 

Current members
 Hasse Carlsson – guitars, vocals (1960–present)
 Dennis Janebrink – bass (1960–present)
 Stefan Kardebratt – keyboards (2005–present)
 Douglas Möller – guitars (2008–present)
 Ulf Georgsson – drums (2013–present)

Former members
 Bjarne Lundqvist – drums (1960–1963, 1993–2007)
 Gunnar Karlsson – guitars (1960–1984)
 Carl-Mårten Nilsson – keyboards (1960–1965)
 Boris Estulf – drums (1963–1993)
 Åke Andersson – keyboards, saxophones, flutes, clarinets (1966–1978)
 Askin Arsunan – keyboards (1978–1980)
 Hans Otterberg – keyboards (1980–2002)
 Henrik Uhlin – guitars, saxophones (1984–2008)
 Fredrik Strelvik – keyboards (2002–2004)
 Lars Lindholm – drums (2007–2013)

Discography 

 Harrli! Harrlå! (1967)
 Ja' går ut med hunden! Sticker ut ett slag... (1968)
 Chin Chin (1969)
 Hälften av varje (1970)
 Flamingokvintetten 1 (1970)
 Flamingokvintetten 2 (1972)
 Flamingokvintetten 3 (1972)
 Flamingokvintetten 4 (1973)
 Flamingokvintetten 5 (1974)
 Flamingokvintetten 6 (1975)
 Flamingokvintetten 7 (1976)
 Singel LP (1977)
 Flamingokvintetten 8 (1977)
 Flamingokvintetten 9 (1978)
 Flamingokvintetten 10 (1979)
 Flamingokvintetten 11 (1980)
 Flamingokvintetten 12 (1981)
 Flamingokvintetten 13 (1982)
 Flamingokvintetten 14 (1983)
 Flamingokvintetten 15 - En vän du kan väcka mitt i natten (1984)
 Flamingokvintetten 16 (1985)
 Flamingokvintetten 17 - Flickan från Heidelberg (1986)
 Flamingokvintetten 18 (1987)
 Flamingokvintetten 19 (1988)
 Flamingokvintetten 20 (1989)
 Flamingokvintetten 21 (1992)
 Samma tid samma plats (1993)
 Favoriter (1996)
 Lata dagar med dig (1997)
 Da Capo (2000)
 Amor (2001)
 Tack & förlåt (2010)
 Den här sången... (2012)

References

External links 

 
 

Musical groups established in 1960
Dansbands
Swedish pop music groups
1960 establishments in Sweden